The 2018 Boycott in Morocco was a popular consumer boycott against price gouging, market monopolization, and business-politics conflicts of interest in Morocco, targeting Sidi Ali bottled water, Afriquia gas, and  dairy products—three corporate brands closely associated with political power in Morocco.

Analysts saw the boycott as sending a message against ties between money and power to figures holding positions of power in public office while managing private economic activities. Observers considered the issue to be political and not legal, as no protections had been put in place to look out for potential conflicts of interest.

History 
The 2018 boycott was the first of its kind in Morocco, which since the year before had been experiencing Hirak Rif protests against poverty, unemployment, and corruption—the most intense unrest since the Arab Spring in 2011.

The boycott began April 20, 2018 when anonymous activists posted calls for the boycott on Facebook. Humor and meme culture were an essential part of the online spread of the boycott, which saw a considerable popular response. A study by L'Économiste found that out of 3700 Moroccans interviewed, 74% had heard of the boycott and 54% were participating in it, indicating that the middle class was driving the boycott.

Targeted brands

Sidi Ali 
The bottled mineral water brand Sidi Ali is produced by Oulmes Mineral Water, a company founded by Abdelkader Bensalah in 1933 through a concession granted by the French Protectorate for the exploitation of the Ain Lalla Haya spring.

Afriquia gas 
Afriquia Gas is owned by the conglomerate Akwa Group, whose CEO Aziz Akhannouch was also then serving as Morocco's minister of agriculture.

Centrale Danone 
Centrale Danone is a subsidiary of the French group Danone.

Effects 
Centrale Danone posted a net loss in 2018 of 538 million Dirhams, the equivalent of 55 million US dollars at the time—down 27% from the year before.

References 

Boycotts
2018 in Morocco